Christian Jidayi (born 3 March 1987) is an Italian football coach and a former player.

Biography
Born in Avellino, Campania, Jidayi started his career at Romagna club A.C. Cesena. He left the under-20 reserve team in 2006 for Bellaria – Igea Marina. Jidayi returned to Cesena for 2007–08 Serie B. he played 5 times. Jidayi was swapped to Mantova on 30 June 2008 for Stefano Mondini in co-ownership deal, both 50% registration rights were tagged for €750,000. Jidayi spent half season with the Serie B club. On 2 February 2009 Jidayi left for Bassano. In June 2009 both Jidayi and Mondini returned to their mother clubs for the same price. Jidayi signed a 2-year contract. Cesena swapped Jidayi again on 31 August 2009, with José Espinal of Novara Calcio. Both players were "valued" €1.5 million. Jidayi signed a 5-year contract. However except the financial effect, Jidayi never had a chance with Novara. He left for Lecco in 2010 and became a ghost player of Novara in 2011–12 Serie A. On 3 August 2012 he left for the fourth division club Saint-Christophe Vallée d’Aoste. On 28 August 2013 he was signed by Forlì, also in the Lega Pro Seconda Divisione.

On 16 September 2015 he was signed by Pro Patria in a temporary deal. He then briefly served as assistant coach of San Marino from 2017 to 2019.

Personal life
Christians's brother William also a professional footballer.

References

External links
 Lega Serie B profile 

Italian footballers
A.C. Cesena players
A.C. Bellaria Igea Marina players
Mantova 1911 players
Bassano Virtus 55 S.T. players
Novara F.C. players
Calcio Lecco 1912 players
Serie B players
Association football defenders
People from Avellino
Italian people of Nigerian descent
Italian sportspeople of African descent
1987 births
Living people
Footballers from Campania
Sportspeople from the Province of Avellino